Isturgia univirgaria is a moth of the family Geometridae. It is found in Madagascar and Comoros.

The length of its forewings ranges between 12 and 15mm, and it is colored mostly white, striped with light brown. This species is similar to Isturgia catalaunaria (Guenée, 1857) and has been misidentified with this species in the past.

Biology
Most specimens are collected from the central highlands of Madagascar, at altitudes between 1000–1600 meters. They are usually found between December and March.

References

Macariini
Moths described in 1880
Moths of Madagascar
Moths of the Comoros